Felix Gerardo Ortiz Torres (born August 5, 1981) and Gabriel Pizarro (born December 10, 1980), known by their stage name Zion & Lennox, are Puerto Rican reggaeton singers, rappers and songwriters. Both artists were born in Carolina, Puerto Rico, were the duo was originated in 2000. They were part of the reggaeton underground scene until 2004, year in which they released their first studio album, Motivando a la Yal, under White Lion Records. The production's success was later influenced by Daddy Yankee's Barrio Fino, which led reggaeton to mainstream audiences. Also the track "Ahora" featuring Angel Doze was included into the video game FIFA Football 2005 soundtrack.

In 2007, the duo decided to have a short hiatus period and they released their respective studio albums as soloists: The Perfect Melody (Zion) and Los Mero Meros (Lennox). Three years later, they signed in Pina Records and released their second studio album, Los Verdaderos, the same year and also participated on the label's album La Formula in 2012. Four years later, the duo released their third studio album, Motivan2, under Warner Music Latina. Throughout their career, Zion & Lennox explored different music genres, such as reggaeton, hip hop, latin pop, electropop, contemporary R&B and dancehall.

Their discography consists of three studio albums, two mixtapes, a re-issue, a collaborative album, fourteen singles and twenty music videos as of March 2017.

Albums

Studio

Mixtapes and re-issues

Collaborative

Singles

As lead artist

Other charted songs

As featured artist

Music videos

Featured music videos

Album appearances

Other non-album guest appearances

Zion solo 

Felix Gerardo Ortiz Torres (born August 5, 1981), known by his stage name Zion, is a Puerto Rican singer-songwriter. Despite spending almost his entire career in a duo with Lennox, Zion had a short solo period between 2006 and 2007, in which he released The Perfect Melody. The album was certified Platinum (Latin) by the Recording Industry Association of America (RIAA) for surpassing 100,000 sales in the United States. After returning from his duo hiatus with Lennox, Zion had occasional guest appearances as soloist from 2008 to 2016.

His solo discography consists of a studio album, six singles and eight music videos.

Singles

Other charted songs

Featured singles

Music videos

Featured music videos

Album appearances

Other non-album guest appearances

Notes

References 

Reggaeton discographies
Discographies of Puerto Rican artists